The 2004 United States presidential election was the 55th quadrennial presidential election, held on Tuesday, November 2, 2004. The Republican ticket of incumbent President George W. Bush and his running mate incumbent Vice President Dick Cheney were elected to a second term, defeating the Democratic ticket of John Kerry, a United States senator from Massachusetts and his running mate John Edwards, a United States senator from North Carolina. As of 2020, this is the only presidential election since 1988 in which the Republican nominee won the popular vote. Due to the higher turnout, both major party nominees set records for the most popular votes received by a major party candidate for president; both men surpassed Reagan's record from 20 years earlier. At the time, Bush's 62,040,610 votes were the most received by any nominee for president, although this record would be broken four years later by Barack Obama. Bush also became the only incumbent president to win re-election after losing the popular vote in the previous election as Rutherford Hayes did not seek re-election, and John Quincy Adams, Benjamin Harrison, and Donald Trump were each defeated when they sought re-election. 

Bush and Cheney were renominated by their party with no difficulty. Former Vermont governor Howard Dean emerged as the early front-runner in the 2004 Democratic Party presidential primaries, but Kerry won the first set of primaries in January and clinched his party's nomination in March after a series of primary victories. Kerry chose Edwards, who had himself sought the party's 2004 presidential nomination, to be his running mate.

Bush's popularity had soared early in his first term after the September 11 attacks in 2001, but it had declined significantly by 2004. Foreign policy was the dominant theme throughout the election campaign, particularly Bush's handling of the war on terror and the 2003 invasion of Iraq. Bush presented himself as a decisive leader and attacked Kerry as a "flip-flopper". Kerry criticized Bush's conduct of the Iraq War, despite having voted for it himself. Domestic issues were debated as well, including the economy and jobs, health care, abortion, same-sex marriage and embryonic stem cell research.

Bush won by a narrow margin of 35 electoral votes and took 50.7% of the popular vote. He swept the former Confederacy and the Mountain States and took the crucial swing states of Ohio, Iowa, and New Mexico, the latter two flipping Republican. Although Kerry flipped New Hampshire, Bush won both more electoral votes and states than in 2000. Some aspects of the election process were subject to controversy, but not to the degree seen in the 2000 presidential election. Bush won Florida by a five-percent margin, a significant improvement over his razor-thin victory margin in the state 4 years earlier which led to a legal challenge in Bush v. Gore. In addition, Republicans increased their majorities in both houses of Congress in the concurrent congressional elections, which gave Bush a comfortable congressional majority as he entered his second term. This is the most recent time either major party improved on its electoral vote margin, compared to the preceding election, as well as the last time both major party presidential and vice presidential nominees were white men.   

Bush served his second term as president and was succeeded by Democrat Barack Obama, who was elected president in 2008, while Kerry continued to serve in the Senate and later became Secretary of State during Obama's second term. Bush's victory also marks the only time in U.S. history that a winning presidential candidate failed to win any electoral votes in the Northeast, as well as the last time a candidate has carried every state from the former Confederacy. This is also the most recent presidential election in which Colorado, Virginia, Nevada, and New Mexico voted Republican, and the last until 2016 in which Florida, Ohio, and Iowa did so.

Background 
George W. Bush won the presidency in 2000 after the Supreme Court's decision in Bush v. Gore remanded the case to the Florida Supreme Court, which declared there was not sufficient time to hold a recount without violating the U.S. Constitution.

Just eight months into his presidency, the terrorist attacks of September 11, 2001, suddenly transformed Bush into a wartime president. Bush's approval ratings surged to near 90%. Within a month, the forces of a coalition led by the United States entered Afghanistan, which had been sheltering Osama bin Laden, suspected mastermind of the September 11 attacks. The Taliban had been removed by December, although a long reconstruction would follow.

The Bush administration then turned its attention to Iraq and argued the need to remove Saddam Hussein from power in Iraq had become urgent. The Iraq issue gave Bush an antagonist to present to the people, rallying support against a common enemy rather than gaining voters through ideas or policy. Among the stated reasons were that Saddam's regime had tried to acquire nuclear material and had not properly accounted for biological and chemical material it was known to have previously possessed. Both the possession of these weapons of mass destruction (WMD), and the failure to account for them, would violate the UN sanctions. The assertion about WMD was hotly advanced by the Bush administration from the beginning, but other major powers including China, France, Germany, and Russia remained unconvinced that Iraq was a threat and refused to allow passage of a UN Security Council resolution to authorize the use of force. Iraq permitted UN weapon inspectors in November 2002, who were continuing their work to assess the WMD claim when the Bush administration decided to proceed with war without UN authorization and told the inspectors to leave the country. The United States invaded Iraq on March 20, 2003, along with a "coalition of the willing" that consisted of additional troops from the United Kingdom, and to a lesser extent, from Australia and Poland. Within about three weeks, the invasion caused the collapse of both the Iraqi government and its armed forces. However, the U.S. and allied forces failed to find any weapon of mass destruction in Iraq. Nevertheless, on May 1, George W. Bush landed on the aircraft carrier , in a Lockheed S-3 Viking, where he gave a speech announcing the end of "major combat operations" in the Iraq War. Bush's approval rating in May was at 66%, according to a CNN–USA Today–Gallup poll. However, Bush's high approval ratings did not last. First, while the war itself was popular in the U.S., the reconstruction and attempted "democratization" of Iraq lost some support as months passed and casualty figures increased, with no decrease in violence nor progress toward stability or reconstruction. Second, as investigators combed through the country, they failed to find the predicted WMD stockpiles, which led to debate over the rationale for the war.

Nominations

Republican nomination 

Bush's popularity rose as a wartime president, and he was able to ward off any serious challenge to the Republican nomination. Senator Lincoln Chafee from Rhode Island considered challenging Bush on an anti-war platform in New Hampshire, but decided not to run after the capture of Saddam Hussein in December 2003.

On March 10, 2004, Bush officially attained the number of delegates needed to be nominated at the 2004 Republican National Convention in  New York City. He accepted the nomination on September 2, 2004, and retained Vice President Dick Cheney as his running mate. During the convention and throughout the campaign, Bush focused on two themes: defending America against terrorism and building an ownership society. As well, Bush used populist rhetoric in an attempt to rally voters behind him in a time of international terror. The ownership society included allowing people to invest some of their Social Security in the stock market, increasing home and stock ownership, and encouraging more people to buy their own health insurance.

Democratic Party nomination

Withdrawn candidates

Before the primaries 
By summer 2003, Howard Dean had become the apparent front-runner for the Democratic nomination, performing strongly in most polls and leading the pack with the largest campaign war chest. His strength as a fund raiser was attributed mainly to his embrace of the Internet for campaigning. The majority of his donations came from individual supporters, who became known as Deanites, or, more commonly, Deaniacs. Generally regarded as a pragmatic centrist during his governorship, Dean emerged during his presidential campaign as a left-wing populist, denouncing the Bush policies like invasion of Iraq as well as fellow Democrats, who, in his view, failed to strongly oppose them. Senator Joe Lieberman, a liberal on domestic issues but a hawk on the War on Terror, began his candidacy in early 2003 but failed to gain traction with liberal Democratic primary voters.

In September 2003, retired four-star general Wesley Clark announced his intention to run for the Democratic nomination. His campaign focused on themes of leadership and patriotism; early campaign advertisements relied heavily on biography. His late start left him with relatively few detailed policy proposals. His first few debates showed this weakness, although he soon presented a range of position papers, including a major tax-relief plan. Nevertheless, Democrats did not flock to support his campaign.

In sheer numbers, John Kerry had fewer endorsements than Dean, who was far ahead in the superdelegate race going into the Iowa caucuses in January 2004. However, Kerry led the endorsement races in Iowa, New Hampshire, Arizona, South Carolina, New Mexico, and Nevada. His main perceived weakness was in his neighboring state of New Hampshire and nearly all national polls. Most other states did not have updated polling numbers to give an accurate placing for Kerry's campaign before Iowa. Heading into the primaries, Kerry's campaign was largely seen as being in trouble, particularly after he fired campaign manager Jim Jordan. The key factors enabling it to survive were when fellow Massachusetts Senator Ted Kennedy assigned Mary Beth Cahill to be the new campaign manager, as well as Kerry's mortgaging his home to lend the money to his campaign (while his wife was a billionaire, campaign finance rules prohibited using one's personal fortune). He also brought on the "magical" Michael Whouley who would be credited with helping bring home the Iowa victory the same as he did in New Hampshire for Al Gore in 2000 against Bill Bradley.

Iowa caucus 

By the January 2004 Iowa caucuses, the field had dwindled down to nine candidates, as Bob Graham had dropped out of the race. Howard Dean was a strong front-runner. However, the Iowa caucuses yielded unexpectedly strong results for Democratic candidates Kerry, who earned 38% of the state's delegates, and John Edwards, who took 32%. Dean slipped to 18% and into third place, while Richard Gephardt finished fourth (11%). In the days leading up to the Iowa vote, there was much negative campaigning between the Dean and Gephardt candidacies.

The dismal results caused Gephardt to drop out and later endorse Kerry. Carol Moseley Braun also dropped out, endorsing Howard Dean. Besides the impact of coming in third, Dean was further hurt by a speech that he gave while at a post-caucus rally. He was shouting over the cheers of his enthusiastic audience, but the crowd noise was being filtered out by his unidirectional microphone, leaving only his full-throated exhortations audible to the television viewers. To those at home, he seemed to raise his voice out of sheer emotion.
The incessant replaying of the "Dean Scream" by the press became a debate on whether Dean was victimized by media bias. The scream scene was shown approximately 633 times by cable and broadcast news networks in just four days after the incident, an amount not including talk shows and local news broadcasts. However, those in the actual audience that day have insisted that they didn't know about the infamous "scream" until they returned to their hotel rooms and saw it on television.

Kerry had revived his campaign and began using the slogan "Comeback Kerry".

New Hampshire primary 
On January 27, Kerry triumphed again, winning the New Hampshire primary. Dean finished second, Clark came in third, and Edwards placed fourth. The largest of the debates was held at Saint Anselm College, where both Kerry and Dean had strong performances.

South Carolina primary 

Edwards won the South Carolina primary the following week and brought home a strong second-place finish in Oklahoma to Clark. Lieberman dropped out of the campaign the following day. Kerry dominated throughout February and his support quickly snowballed as he won caucuses and primaries, taking in wins in Michigan, Washington, Maine, Tennessee; Washington, D.C.; Nevada, Wisconsin, Utah, Hawaii, and Idaho. Clark and Dean dropped out during this time, leaving Edwards as the only real threat to Kerry. Kucinich and Sharpton continued to run despite poor results at the polls.

Super Tuesday 
In March's Super Tuesday, Kerry won decisive victories in the California, Connecticut, Georgia, Maryland, Massachusetts, New York, Ohio, and Rhode Island primaries as well as in the Minnesota caucuses. Despite having withdrawn from the race two weeks earlier, Dean won his home state of Vermont. Edwards finished only slightly behind Kerry in Georgia, but after failing to win a single state other than South Carolina, he chose to withdraw from the presidential race. Sharpton followed suit a couple weeks later. Kucinich did not leave the race officially until July.

Democratic National Convention 
On July 6, Kerry selected Edwards as his running mate, shortly before the 2004 Democratic National Convention was held later that month in Boston. Days before Kerry announced Edwards as his running mate, Kerry gave a short list of three candidates: Sen. John Edwards, Rep. Dick Gephardt, and Gov. Tom Vilsack. Heading into the convention, the Kerry/Edwards ticket unveiled its new slogan: a promise to make America "stronger at home and more respected in the world." Kerry made his Vietnam War experience the convention's prominent theme. In accepting the nomination, he began his speech with, "I'm John Kerry and I'm reporting for duty." He later delivered what may have been the speech's most memorable line when he said, "the future doesn't belong to fear, it belongs to freedom," a quote that later appeared in a Kerry/Edwards television advertisement.

The keynote address at the convention was delivered by Illinois State Senator and U.S. Senate candidate (as well as future president) Barack Obama; the speech was well received, and it elevated Obama's status within the Democratic Party.

Other nominations 

There were four other presidential tickets on the ballot in a number of states totaling enough electoral votes to have a theoretical possibility of winning a majority in the Electoral College. They were:
 Michael Badnarik / Richard Campagna, Libertarian Party (campaign). Badnarik was nominated on the third ballot and Campagna on the first ballot at the Libertarian National Convention in Atlanta, Georgia, held May 28–31, 2004.
 David Cobb / Pat LaMarche, Green Party (campaign). Cobb was nominated on the second ballot at the 2004 Green National Convention in Milwaukee, Wisconsin, held June 23–28, 2004.
 Ralph Nader / Peter Camejo, independent (also Reform Party, Independent Party (DE), Populist Party (MD), Better Life Party, Cross-endorsements N.Y., Peace and Justice Party, Independence Parties of New York and South Carolina, and the Vermont Green Party who chose not to ratify the national party's presidential nominee).
 Michael Peroutka / Chuck Baldwin, Constitution Party (also Alaskan Independence Party).  Peroutka and Baldwin were unanimously nominated at the Constitution Party National Convention at Valley Forge, Pennsylvania (June 23–26, 2004).

General election campaign

Campaign issues 
Bush focused his campaign on national security, presenting himself as a decisive leader and contrasted Kerry as a "flip-flopper." This strategy was designed to convey to American voters the idea that Bush could be trusted to be tough on terrorism while Kerry would be "uncertain in the face of danger." Bush  also sought to portray Kerry as a "Massachusetts liberal" who was out of touch with mainstream Americans (just as his father did with Michael Dukakis in the 1988 election). One of Kerry's slogans was "Stronger at home, respected in the world." This advanced the suggestion that Kerry would pay more attention to domestic concerns; it also encapsulated Kerry's contention that Bush had alienated American allies by his foreign policy.

According to one exit poll, people who voted for Bush cited the issues of terrorism and traditional values as the most important factors in their decision.  Kerry supporters cited the war in Iraq, the economy and jobs, and health care.

Over the course of Bush's first term in office, his extremely high approval ratings immediately following the September 11, 2001, terrorist attacks steadily dwindled, rising only during combat operations in Iraq in spring 2003, and again following the capture of Saddam Hussein in December that same year.

Between August and September 2004, there was an intense focus on events that occurred in the late-1960s and early-1970s. Bush was accused of failing to fulfill his required service in the Texas Air National Guard.  However, the focus quickly shifted to the conduct of CBS News after they aired a segment on 60 Minutes Wednesday, introducing what became known as the Killian documents. Serious doubts about the documents' authenticity quickly emerged, leading CBS to appoint a review panel that eventually resulted in the firing of the news producer and other significant staffing changes.

Meanwhile, Kerry was accused by the Swift Vets and POWs for Truth, who asserted that "phony war crimes charges, his exaggerated claims about his own service in Vietnam, and his deliberate misrepresentation of the nature and effectiveness of Swift boat operations compels us to step forward." The group challenged the legitimacy of each of the combat medals awarded to Kerry by the U.S. Navy, and the disposition of his discharge.

In the beginning of September, the successful Republican National Convention along with the allegations by Kerry's former mates gave Bush his first comfortable margin since Kerry had won the nomination. A post-convention Gallup poll showed the President leading the Senator by 14 points.

Presidential debates 

Three presidential debates and one vice presidential debate were organized by the Commission on Presidential Debates, and held in the autumn of 2004. As expected, these debates set the agenda for the final leg of the political contest. Libertarian Party candidate Michael Badnarik and Green Party candidate David Cobb were arrested while trying to access the debates. Badnarik was attempting to serve papers to the Commission on Presidential Debates.

 The first debate was held on September 30, slated to focus on foreign policy, Kerry accused Bush of having failed to gain international support for the invasion of Iraq, saying the only countries assisting the U.S. during the invasion were the United Kingdom and Australia. Bush replied to this by saying, "Well, actually, he forgot Poland." Later, a consensus formed among mainstream pollsters and pundits that Kerry won the debate decisively, strengthening what had come to be seen as a weak and troubled campaign. In the days after, coverage focused on Bush's apparent annoyance with Kerry and numerous scowls and negative facial expressions.
 On October 5, the vice presidential debate between Cheney and Edwards. An initial poll by ABC indicated a victory for Cheney, while polls by CNN and MSNBC gave it to Edwards.
 The second presidential debate was conducted in a town meeting format, less formal than the first presidential debate. This debate saw Bush and Kerry taking questions on a variety of subjects from a local audience.  Bush attempted to deflect criticism of what was described as his scowling demeanor during the first debate, joking at one point about one of Kerry's remarks, "That answer made me want to scowl."
 Bush and Kerry met for the third and final debate on October 13.  51 million viewers watched the debate. After Kerry, responding to a question about gay rights, reminded the audience that Vice President Cheney's daughter was a lesbian, Cheney responded with a statement calling himself "a pretty angry father" due to Kerry using Cheney's daughter's sexual orientation for his political purposes. Polls taken by Gallup in found that Kerry pulled ahead in October, but showed a tight race as the election drew to a close.

Osama bin Laden videotape 

On October 29, four days before the election, excerpts of a video of Osama bin Laden addressing the American people were broadcast on al Jazeera. In his remarks, bin Laden mentions the September 11, 2001 attacks and taunted Bush over his response to them. In the days following the video's release, Bush's lead over Kerry increased by several points.

Notable expressions and phrases 
 Bring it on: Kerry used this to make the point that he was not afraid of attacks by the George W. Bush campaign. This phrase had previously been used by Bush in the summer of 2003, warning insurgents that the United States would not be intimidated to leave Iraq until after the country had been stabilized.
 Flip-flop: although the term existed prior to the elections, Republicans used it to describe John Kerry after he said "I actually did vote for the $87 billion, before I voted against it."
 Highlighting Kerry's alleged "flip-flops," the Republican National Committee placed on the web an advertisement that compared Kerry to a periodical cicada, one of whose largest brood's (Brood X) emerged within the eastern U.S. during 2004. The ad portrayed a cicada’s face changing into a picture of a confused-looking Kerry, while stating:  Every 17 years, cicadas emerge, morph out of their shell, and change their appearance. Like a cicada, Senator Kerry would like to shed his Senate career and morph into a fiscal conservative, a centrist Democrat opposed to taxes, strong on defense.”
 Joementum: used in the primaries by Joe Lieberman to say that he had momentum. It was later used to ridicule Lieberman, since his campaign did not pick up momentum and he dropped out of the race (not to be confused with the 2020 Democratic Primary, in which Joe Biden gained momentum after the South Carolina Primary).
 Swiftboating: a term used during the campaign to describe the work of the Swift Boat Veterans for Truth. The term has been used since the campaign to describe a harsh attack by a political opponent that is dishonest, personal and unfair.
 You forgot Poland: paraphrased from Bush's comment in the first debate when he said "Well, actually, he forgot Poland." Used to emphasize that the coalition against Iraq was not as big as the list suggested because most of the participating countries sent a small number of troops.

Results  

Source (Electoral and Popular Vote): Federal Elections Commission Electoral and Popular Vote Summary
Voting age population: 215,664,000

Percent of voting age population casting a vote for president: 56.70%

(a) One faithless elector from Minnesota cast an electoral vote for John Edwards (written as John Ewards) for president.
(b) Because Arrin Hawkins, then aged 28, was constitutionally ineligible to serve as vice president, Margaret Trowe replaced her on the ballot in some states. James Harris replaced Calero on certain other states' ballots.

Results by state 
The following table records the official vote tallies for each state as reported by the official Federal Election Commission report. The column labeled "Margin" shows Bush's margin of victory over Kerry (the margin is negative for states and districts won by Kerry).

Although Guam has no votes in the Electoral College, they have held a straw poll for their presidential preferences since 1980. In 2004, the results were Bush 21,490 (64.1%), Kerry 11,781 (35.1%), Nader 196 (0.58%) and Badnarik 67 (0.2%).

Maine and Nebraska each allowed for their electoral votes to be split between candidates. In both states, two electoral votes were awarded to the winner of the statewide race and one electoral vote was awarded to the winner of each congressional district.

Close states 
Red font color denotes those won by Republican President George W. Bush; blue denotes states won by Democrat John Kerry.

States where margin of victory was under 1% (22 electoral votes):
 Wisconsin 0.38% (11,384 votes)
 Iowa 0.67% (10,059 votes)
 New Mexico 0.79% (5,988 votes)

States where margin of victory was more than 1% but less than 5% (93 electoral votes):
 New Hampshire 1.37% (9,274 votes)
 Ohio 2.11% (118,601 votes) (tipping point state)
 Pennsylvania 2.50% (144,248 votes)
 Nevada 2.59% (21,500 votes)
 Michigan 3.42% (165,437 votes)
 Minnesota 3.48% (98,319 votes)
 Oregon 4.16% (76,332 votes)
 Colorado 4.67% (99,523 votes)

States where margin of victory was more than 5% but less than 10% (149 electoral votes):
 Florida 5.01% (380,978 votes)
 Maine's 2nd Congressional District 5.82% (20,762 votes)
 New Jersey 6.68% (241,427 votes)
 Washington 7.18% (205,307 votes)
 Missouri 7.20% (196,542 votes)
 Delaware 7.59% (28,492 votes)
 Virginia 8.20% (262,217 votes)
 Hawaii 8.74% (37,517 votes)
 Maine 9.00% (66,641 votes)
 Arkansas 9.76% (102,945 votes)
 California 9.95% (1,235,659 votes)

Statistics 

Counties with Highest Percent of Vote (Republican)
 Ochiltree County, Texas 91.97%
 Madison County, Idaho 91.89%
 Glasscock County, Texas 91.56%
 Roberts County, Texas 90.93%
 Arthur County, Nebraska 90.23%

Counties with Highest Percent of Vote (Democratic)
 Washington, D.C. 89.18%
 Shannon County, South Dakota 84.62%
 City and County of San Francisco, California 83.02%
 Macon County, Alabama 82.92%
 Bronx County, New York 82.80%

Notes on results 
Bush received 62,040,610 popular votes compared to Kerry's 59,028,444.

Because of a request by Ralph Nader, New York held a recount.
In New York, Bush obtained 2,806,993 votes on the Republican ticket and 155,574 on the Conservative Party ticket. Kerry obtained 4,180,755 votes on the Democratic ticket and 133,525 votes on the Working Families ticket. Nader obtained 84,247 votes on the Independence ticket, and 15,626 votes on the Peace and Justice ticket.

Note also: Official Federal Election Commission Report, with the latest, most final, and complete vote totals available.

Finance 

 George W. Bush (R) $367,227,801 / 62,040,610 = $5.92
 John Kerry (D) $326,236,288 / 59,028,444 = $5.53
 Ralph Nader (I) $4,566,037 / 465,151 = $9.82
 Michael Badnarik (L) $1,093,013 / 397,265 = $2.75
 Michael Peroutka (C) $729,087 / 143,630 = $5.08
 David Cobb (G) $493,723 / 119,859 = $4.12
 Walt Brown (SPUSA) $2,060 / 10,837 = $0.19
 (money spent/total votes=average spent per vote)

Source: FEC

2004 United States Electoral College

Ballot access

Faithless elector in Minnesota 
One elector in Minnesota cast a ballot for president with the name of "John Ewards"  written on it. The Electoral College officials certified this ballot as a vote for John Edwards for president. The remaining nine electors cast ballots for John Kerry. All ten electors in the state cast ballots for John Edwards for vice president (John Edwards's name was spelled correctly on all ballots for vice president). This was the first time in U.S. history that an elector had cast a vote for the same person to be both president and vice president.

Electoral balloting in Minnesota was performed by secret ballot, and none of the electors admitted to casting the Edwards vote for president, so it may never be known who the faithless elector was. It is not even known whether the vote for Edwards was deliberate or unintentional; the Republican Secretary of State and several of the Democratic electors have expressed the opinion that this was an accident.

Electoral vote error in New York 
New York's initial electoral vote certificate indicated that all of its 31 electoral votes for president were cast for "John L. Kerry of Massachusetts" instead of John F. Kerry, who won the popular vote in the state.  This was apparently the result of a typographical error, and an amended electoral vote certificate with the correct middle initial was transmitted to the President of the Senate prior to the official electoral vote count.

Voter demographics

Source: CNN exit poll (13,660 surveyed)

Battleground states 

During the campaign and as the results came in on the night of the election there was much focus on Ohio, Pennsylvania, and Florida. These three swing states were seen as evenly divided, and with each casting 20 electoral votes or more, they had the power to decide the election. As the final results came in, Kerry took Pennsylvania and then Bush took Florida, focusing all attention on Ohio.

The morning after the election, the major candidates were neck and neck. It was clear that the result in Ohio, along with two other states who had still not declared (New Mexico and Iowa), would decide the winner. Bush had established a lead of around 130,000 votes but the Democrats pointed to provisional ballots that had yet to be counted, initially reported to number as high as 200,000. Bush had preliminary leads of less than 5% of the vote in only four states, but if Iowa, Nevada and New Mexico had all eventually gone to Kerry, a win for Bush in Ohio would have created a 269–269 tie in the Electoral College. The result of an electoral tie would cause the election to be decided in the House of Representatives with each state casting one vote, regardless of population. Such a scenario would almost certainly have resulted in a victory for Bush, as Republicans controlled more House delegations. Therefore, the outcome of the election hinged solely on the result in Ohio, regardless of the final totals elsewhere. In the afternoon of the day after the election, Ohio's Secretary of State, Ken Blackwell, announced that it was statistically impossible for the Democrats to make up enough valid votes in the provisional ballots to win. At the time provisional ballots were reported as numbering 140,000 (and later estimated to be only 135,000). Faced with this announcement, Kerry conceded defeat.

The upper Midwest bloc of Minnesota, Iowa, and Wisconsin is also notable, casting a sum of 27 electoral votes. The following is list of the states considered swing states in the 2004 election by most news organizations and which candidate they eventually went for. The two major parties chose to focus their advertising on these states:

Election conspiracy theories 

After the election, some sources  reported indications of possible data irregularities and systematic flaws during the voting process.

Although the overall result of the election was not challenged by the Kerry campaign, Green Party presidential candidate David Cobb and Libertarian Party presidential candidate Michael Badnarik obtained a recount in Ohio. This recount was completed December 28, 2004, although on January 24, 2007, a jury convicted two Ohio elections officials of selecting precincts to recount where they already knew the hand total would match the machine total, thereby avoiding having to perform a full recount.

At the official counting of the electoral votes on January 6, an objection was made under the Electoral Count Act (now ) to Ohio's electoral votes. Because the motion was supported by at least one member of both the House of Representatives and the Senate, the law required that the two houses separate to debate and vote on the objection. In the House of Representatives, the objection was supported by 31 Democrats. It was opposed by 178 Republicans, 88 Democrats and one independent. Not voting were 52 Republicans and 80 Democrats.  Four people elected to the House had not yet taken office, and one seat was vacant. In the Senate, it was supported only by its maker, Barbara Boxer, with 74 Senators opposed and 25 not voting. During the debate, no Senator argued that the outcome of the election should be changed by either court challenge or revote. Boxer claimed that she had made the motion not to challenge the outcome, but "to cast the light of truth on a flawed system which must be fixed now.".

Kerry would later state that "the widespread irregularities make it impossible to know for certain that the [Ohio] outcome reflected the will of the voters." In the same article, Democratic National Committee Chairman Howard Dean said "I'm not confident that the election in Ohio was fairly decided... We know that there was substantial voter suppression, and the machines were not reliable. It should not be a surprise that the Republicans are willing to do things that are unethical to manipulate elections. That's what we suspect has happened."

Points of controversy 
 There is no individual federal agency with direct regulatory authority of the U.S. voting machine industry. However, the Election Assistance Commission has full regulatory authority over federal testing and certification processes, as well as an influential advisory role in certain voting industry matters. Further oversight authority belongs to the Government Accountability Office, regularly investigating voting system related issues.
 The Ohio Secretary of State, Ken Blackwell, who simultaneously served as co-chair of the 2004 Republican Presidential Campaign, came under fire for failing to uphold his legal obligation to investigate potential voter fraud, manipulation, and irregularities, in a 100-page report by Democrats on the staff of the House Judiciary Committee.
 Walden O'Dell the former CEO of Diebold (the parent company of voting machine manufacturer Diebold Election Systems) was an active fundraiser for George W. Bush's re-election campaign and wrote in a fund-raising letter dated August 13, 2003, that he was committed "to helping Ohio deliver its electoral votes to the President."
 Republican Senator Chuck Hagel, who was on a short list of George W. Bush's vice-presidential candidates, served as the chairman of ES&S in the early 1990s when it operated under the name American Information Systems Inc. (AIS). ES&S voting machines tabulated 85 percent of the votes cast in Hagel's 2002 and 1996 election races. In 2003 Hagel disclosed a financial stake in McCarthy Group Inc., the holding company of ES&S.
 Global Election Systems, which was purchased by Diebold Election Systems and developed the core technology behind the company's voting machines and voter registration system, employed five convicted felons as consultants and developers.
 Jeff Dean, a former senior vice-president of Global Election Systems when Diebold bought it, had previously been convicted of 23 counts of felony theft in the first degree. Bev Harris reports Dean was retained as a consultant by Diebold Election Systems, though Diebold has disputed the consulting relationship. Dean was convicted of theft via "alteration of records in the computerized accounting system" using a "high degree of sophistication" to evade detection over a period of 2 years.
 International election observers were barred from the polls in Ohio by then Republican Ohio Secretary of State Ken Blackwell. Blackwell's office argues this was the correct interpretation of Ohio law.
 California Secretary of State Kevin Shelley decertified all Diebold Election Systems touch-screen voting machines due to computer-science reports released detailing design and security concerns.
 30% of all U.S. votes cast in the 2004 election were cast on direct-recording electronic (DRE) voting machine, which do not print individual paper records of each vote.
 Numerous statistical analyses showed "discrepancy in the number of votes Bush received in counties that used the touch-screen machines and counties that used other types of voting equipment" as well as discrepancies with exit polls, favoring President George W. Bush.

New during this campaign

International observers 
At the invitation of the United States government, the Organization for Security and Cooperation in Europe (OSCE) sent a team of observers to monitor the presidential elections in 2004. It was the first time the OSCE had sent observers to a U.S. presidential election, although they had been invited in the past. In September 2004 the OSCE issued a report on U.S. electoral processes and the election final report. The report reads: "The November 2, 2004 elections in the United States mostly met the OSCE commitments included in the 1990 Copenhagen Document. They were conducted in an environment that reflects a long-standing democratic tradition, including institutions governed by the rule of law, free and generally professional media, and a civil society intensively engaged in the election process. There was exceptional public interest in the two leading presidential candidates and the issues raised by their respective campaigns, as well as in the election process itself."

Earlier, some 13 U.S. Representatives from the Democratic Party had sent a letter to United Nations Secretary-General Kofi Annan asking for the UN to monitor the elections. The UN responded that such a request could only come from the official national executive. The move was met with opposition from some Republican lawmakers. The OSCE is not affiliated with the United Nations.

Electronic voting 

For 2004, some states expedited the implementation of electronic voting systems for the election, raising several issues:
 Software. Without proper testing and certification, critics believe electronic voting machines could produce an incorrect report due to malfunction or deliberate manipulation.
 Recounts. A recount of an electronic voting machine is not a recount in the traditional sense. The machine can be audited for irregularities and voting totals stored on multiple backup devices can be compared, but vote counts will not change.
 Partisan ties. Democrats noted the Republican or conservative ties of several leading executives in the companies providing the machines.

Campaign law changes 
The 2004 election was the first to be affected by the campaign finance reforms mandated by the Bipartisan Campaign Reform Act of 2002 (also known as the McCain–Feingold Bill for its sponsors in the United States Senate). Because of the Act's restrictions on candidates' and parties' fundraising, a large number of so-called 527 groups emerged. Named for a section of the Internal Revenue Code, these groups were able to raise large amounts of money for various political causes as long as they do not coordinate their activities with political campaigns. Examples of 527s include Swift Boat Veterans for Truth, MoveOn.org, the Media Fund, and America Coming Together. Many such groups were active throughout the campaign season (there was some similar activity, although on a much lesser scale, during the 2000 campaign).

To distinguish official campaigning from independent campaigning, political advertisements on television were required to include a verbal disclaimer identifying the organization responsible for the advertisement. Advertisements produced by political campaigns usually included the statement, "I'm [candidate's name], and I approve this message." Advertisements produced by independent organizations usually included the statement, "[Organization name] is responsible for the content of this advertisement", and from September 3 (60 days before the general election), such organizations' ads were prohibited from mentioning any candidate by name. Previously, television advertisements only required a written "paid for by" disclaimer on the screen.

This law was not well known or widely publicized at the beginning of the Democratic primary season, which led to some early misperception of Howard Dean, who was the first candidate to buy television advertising in this election cycle. Not realizing that the law required the phrasing, some people viewing the ads reportedly questioned why Dean might say such a thing—such questions were easier to ask because of the maverick nature of Dean's campaign in general.

Colorado's Amendment 36 

A ballot initiative in Colorado, known as Amendment 36, would have changed the way in which the state apportions its electoral votes. Rather than assigning all 9 of the state's electors to the candidate with a plurality of popular votes, under the amendment Colorado would have assigned presidential electors proportionally to the statewide vote count, which would be a unique system (Nebraska and Maine assign electoral votes based on vote totals within each congressional district). Opponents claimed that this splitting would diminish Colorado's influence in the Electoral College, and the amendment ultimately failed, receiving only 34% of the vote.

See also 
 Timeline of the 2004 United States presidential election
 Ralph Nader's presidential campaigns
 Jesusland map
 Newspaper endorsements in the 2004 United States presidential election
 History of the United States (1991–2008)
 Kerry Fonda 2004 election photo controversy
 Killian documents authenticity issues
 Second inauguration of George W. Bush
 White House shakeup (2004)

Other elections 
 2004 United States gubernatorial elections
 2004 United States House of Representatives elections
 2004 United States Senate elections

Notes

References

Sources 
 Official Federal Election Commission Report, a PDF file, with the latest, most final, and complete vote totals available.
 
 Barone, Michael J. The Almanac of American Politics: 2006 (2005)
 Daclon, Corrado Maria, US elections and war on terrorism (2004), Analisi Difesa, no. 50
 Evan Thomas, Eleanor Clift, and Staff of Newsweek. Election 2004 (2005)

Books 
 Ceaser, James W. and Andrew E. Busch. Red Over Blue: The 2004 Elections and American Politics (2005), narrative history.
 Freeman, Steven F. and Joel Bleifuss, Foreword by U.S. Representative John Conyers, Jr. Was the 2004 Presidential Election Stolen? Exit Polls, Election Fraud, and the Official Count (Seven Stories Press, 2006) 
 Greene, John C. and Mark J. Rozell, eds. The Values Campaign?: The Christian Right and the 2004 Elections (2006)
 Miller, Mark Crispin. Fooled Again: How the Right Stole the 2004 Election (2005) –
 Sabato, Larry J. Divided States of America: The Slash And Burn Politics of the 2004 Presidential Election (2005)
 Stempel III, Guido H. and Thomas K. Hargrove, eds. The 21st-Century Voter: Who Votes, How They Vote, and Why They Vote (2 vol. 2015)

Further reading

External links 

 
 Election of 2004 in Counting the Votes

Official candidate websites 

 Michael Badnarik (Libertarian) (archived version from the U.S. Library of Congress United States Election 2004 Web Archive)
 George W. Bush (Republican) (archived version from the U.S. Library of Congress United States Election 2004 Web Archive)
 David Cobb (Green) (archived version from the U.S. Library of Congress United States Election 2004 Web Archive)
 John Kerry (Democrat) (archived version from the U.S. Library of Congress United States Election 2004 Web Archive)
 Ralph Nader (Independent) (archived version from the U.S. Library of Congress United States Election 2004 Web Archive)

Election maps and analysis 
 Maps of proportion shift, counties more Republican, counties more Democratic, compared to 2000 election.
 NYTimes.com 2004 Election Results Interactive Graphic
 PBS.org Interactive Electoral College Map
 Maps and cartograms of the 2004 U.S. presidential election results – Michael Gastner, Cosma Shalizi, and Mark Newman, University of Michigan
 Election 2004 Results – Robert J. Vanderbei, Princeton University
 Interactive Atlas of the 2004 Presidential Election Results – Dave Liep
 Alternate views of the electoral results map
 Assessing the Vote and the Roots of American Political Divide

State-by-state forecasts of electoral vote outcome 
 Probability analysis of Electoral College based on latest poll results by state
 Electoral Vote Predictor 2004
 Larry J. Sabato's Crystal Ball
 
 USA Today polls

Controversies 
 About.com, Democracy & Voting Rights – Ohio 2004 Election as Lesson in What Can Go Wrong

Election campaign funding 
 Money Maps

Campaign ads 
 Campaign commercials from the 2004 election

 
Dick Cheney
John Kerry
George W. Bush
John Edwards
Presidency of George W. Bush
November 2004 events in the United States